Deception  is a Ugandan drama  television series developed by Edris Matu Segawa and directed by George Kihumbah.  The series ran on NTV Uganda for eight seasons from 2013 to 2016. The series won a number of awards including 2014 RTV Awards for Best TV Drama of the year, 2015 RTV Awards as Best TV Drama of the year and 2016 Uganda Entertainment Award for Best TV Series.

During its first season the show had a running time of 30 minutes and then was extended to 45 minutes for the rest of its season. Airing every Mondays and Tuesdays at 8pm.

Deception became one of the most popular TV drama series in Uganda and the second attempt at TV shows by NTV Uganda after 2009's KAKIBEKI (what come may!). The show aired its last season in 2016 after a revered 8 season and three-year run.

Plot
Monica and Chris Nsereko are a young happily married couple. Life is good, until Monica's mother in law decides to move in with them, demanding for a grandchild.

The happy couple is dropped in a hole of scandal as the mischievous mother in law pulls every known trick to either get Monica pregnant or throw her out!
 Monica tries to play civil and tolerate her mother in law monster but continuously encouraged by her close friend Lillian to retaliate and save her marriage. Meanwhile, Monica had gotten a miscarriage before and believes that she might be barren and not able to give Chris any children. The show focuses on family life and how intervention by in-laws can destroy and break a marriage. Along the way, Monica is forced to face impossible choices and keep dangerous secrets to save her marriage. As one lie is told to keep another true, Monica and Chris must find a way to rediscover their love.

Awards and nominations
2014 - RTV Awards: Best TV Drama of the year
2015 - RTV Awards:Best TV Drama of the year
Uganda Entertainment Award: 
Best TV Series. 
2016 -Uganda Entertainment Award:
Best TV Series.
2016 - Uganda Film Festival Awards: Best TV Drama, Best Actress in a TV Drama and Best Actor in a TV Drama

See also
Beneath The Lies
Yat Madit
Coffee Shop (TV Series)
Balikoowa in the City
The Campus (TV Series)

References

Ugandan drama television series
2010s Ugandan television series
2013 Ugandan television series debuts
2016 Ugandan television series debuts
NTV Uganda original programming